Shekeb Hamdard, born as Ahmad Shekeb, is a well-known singer from Afghanistan. He is ethnically Hazara and currently continues his music career in the United States. He is the first winner of Afghan Star, a reality TV show in Afghanistan.

Early life 
He migrated to Pakistan at an early age due to the civil war. After the September 11 attacks, under the new Afghan government, he returned and joined Habibia High School of Kabul.

Career 
Hamdard's musical career started after he won the first-ever musical reality TV show in 2005. The Afghan Star is the Afghan version of American Idol which is broadcast by Tolo TV with the financial support of Roshan Telecommunications. After the show, a super hit single Gul Dana Dana was on market by Shakeeb Hamdard. Later, he signed up with Bardburd Music which released his first album Mashallah.

Personal life 
He lives in Jacksonville, Florida, United States. Shakeeb Hamdard belongs to Hazara ethnic group.

Discography 
 2007: Mashallah

See also 
 Afghan Star
 List of Hazara people

References 

1984 births
Living people
Hazara singers
People from Kabul
Afghan male singers
Persian-language singers
Afghan expatriates in Pakistan
21st-century Afghan male singers
American people of Hazara descent
Afghan expatriates in the United States